Crest Manufacturing Company was a manufacturer of automobiles in Cambridge, Massachusetts. They built cars between 1901 and 1904.

The 1904 Crestmobile was a touring car model, notable for its removable tonneau. With the tonneau in place, it could seat 4 passengers and sold for US$850. The vertical-mounted single-cylinder engine, situated at the front of the car, produced 7 hp (5.2 kW). A two-speed sliding transmission was fitted. The tubular-framed car weighed 930 lb (422 kg). It was similar in construction to the contemporary Covert.

See also
List of defunct United States automobile manufacturers

References
 Frank Leslie's Popular Monthly (January 1904)

Veteran vehicles
Defunct motor vehicle manufacturers of the United States
Companies based in Cambridge, Massachusetts
Defunct companies based in Massachusetts
1901 establishments in Massachusetts
1904 disestablishments in Massachusetts
Motor vehicle manufacturers based in Massachusetts